Paul Frederick Kluge (born 1942 in New Jersey) is an American novelist living in Gambier, Ohio.

Kluge was raised in Berkeley Heights, New Jersey. He graduated from Kenyon College in Gambier in 1964 and teaches creative writing there now. He served in the Peace Corps from 1967 to 1969 in Micronesia.

He is the author of several novels, including Eddie and the Cruisers, Biggest Elvis (1997), A Season for War, MacArthur's Ghost, The Day I Die:  A Novel of Suspense, Gone Tomorrow (2008), A Call from Jersey (2010), and The Master Blaster (2012). Kluge’s oeuvre has been the subject of an entry in the Dictionary of Literary Biography .

Kluge's non-fiction work Alma Mater: A College Homecoming (1995) chronicles Kluge's time as a student and teacher at Kenyon College. The Edge of Paradise: America in Micronesia (1991) describes Kluge's return to Micronesia and his observations on how the American presence has affected the islands.

Two of Kluge's works have been made into films: Eddie and the Cruisers, based on his novel of the same name, and Dog Day Afternoon, based on a LIFE magazine article Kluge write with Thomas Moore entitled

References

External links
 P. F. Kluge website 

1942 births
Living people
Kenyon College alumni
Kenyon College faculty
Peace Corps volunteers
People from Berkeley Heights, New Jersey
American male novelists
Novelists from New Jersey
20th-century American novelists
21st-century American novelists
20th-century American male writers
21st-century American male writers
Novelists from Ohio
People from Gambier, Ohio